Mesotrophic may refer to:

 Mesotrophic lake
 Mesotrophic soil

See also 

 Oligotrophic
 Eutrophic